Pterolocera ferrugineofusca is a moth of the Anthelidae family. It was described by Strand in 1925. It is found in Australia.

References

Moths described in 1926
Anthelidae